Nicholas David Jenkins (born 13 May 1967) is a British businessman, best known for founding the online greeting card retailer Moonpig.com, then as a "dragon" for the BBC Two TV business series Dragons' Den in the thirteenth and fourteenth series.

Biography
Born at Droitwich Spa, Worcestershire, Jenkins was educated at Haberdashers' Adams Grammar School, before going up to Birmingham University to read Russian literature. He then worked for eight years as a commodity trader for Glencore in Moscow. Returning to the UK in 1998, he pursued further studies at Cranfield University, graduating as MBA. 

Jenkins launched the greeting card business Moonpig in 2000; 'Moonpig' alluding to his nickname at school, hence the name of the brand. In 2011, he sold Moonpig for an estimated £120 million.

Since 2008, Jenkins has been investing in start-up businesses. He was a member of the Impact Ventures UK investment committee – an investment fund which invests in social enterprises using innovation to find better solutions to social issues in the UK. He is also involved with the educational charity ARK and Shivia.

A donor to the Conservative Party, he was a signatory to a letter to The Daily Telegraph during the 2015 United Kingdom general election campaign, which praised the party's economic policies and claimed that a future Labour government (under Ed Miliband) would “threaten jobs and deter investment”.

Since 2014 Jenkins has owned Stockton House, a Grade I listed mansion in Wiltshire, and is a Liveryman of the Haberdashers' Company since 2018.

References

External links

www.haberdashers.co.uk 

1967 births
Living people
People from Droitwich Spa
People educated at Adams' Grammar School
Alumni of the University of Birmingham
Alumni of Cranfield University
English businesspeople
English television personalities
Conservative Party (UK) donors
Conservative Party (UK) people